Courtin' Trouble is a 1948 American Western film directed by Ford Beebe and written by Ronald Davidson. The film stars Jimmy Wakely, Dub Taylor, Virginia Belmont, Leonard Penn, Marshall Reed and Steve Clark. The film was released on November 21, 1948, by Monogram Pictures.

Plot

Cast          
Jimmy Wakely as Jimmy Wakely
Dub Taylor as Cannonball
Virginia Belmont as Carol Madison
Leonard Penn as Dawson
Marshall Reed as Cody
Steve Clark as Mark Reed
House Peters Jr. as Burt Larsen
Frank LaRue as Judge Madison
William Bailey as Curtis 
Bud Osborne as Sheriff
Bill Hale as Ed Stewart
Bob Woodward as Gill
Carol Henry as Bartender
Bill Potter as Steve Graves

References

External links
 

1948 films
1940s English-language films
American Western (genre) films
1948 Western (genre) films
Monogram Pictures films
Films directed by Ford Beebe
American black-and-white films
1940s American films